On 14 November 2021, a taxi carrying a passenger arrived at the main entrance of Liverpool Women's Hospital in Liverpool, England. An improvised explosive device carried by the passenger ignited, killing him and injuring the driver. The police later declared it to be a terrorist incident.

At the official inquest, on 30 December 2021, it was found that the device, manufactured and carried by the passenger, had been "designed to project shrapnel, with murderous intent".

Incident 
On 14 November 2021, at approximately 10:59 am GMT, an explosion occurred inside a taxi as it arrived in front of the main entrance of the Liverpool Women's Hospital in Liverpool, England. The driver left the vehicle seconds later and ran to safety, after which a fire badly burned the car. The explosion was caused by an improvised explosive device which was carried by the taxi's passenger, who was killed in the incident. The taxi driver was admitted to hospital, with injuries including an ear needing to be sewn back on, but was released the following day. Merseyside Police attended the scene, along with fire and ambulance crews; they were accompanied by the Royal Logistic Corps' Bomb Squad. The hospital was placed under a lockdown, roads were closed and a cordon was in place around the hospital by the evening, and armed police maintained a presence.

The passenger's motivation for carrying the device was not immediately known. One theory emerged that he was intending to walk to Liverpool's Anglican cathedral and detonate his device as the congregation left. The Independent questioned whether there was a "connection between the timing of the incident and the fact that it occurred on Remembrance Sunday, with the associated minute's silence usually observed at 11 am". The hospital is a short distance from the cathedral, where the remembrance service was taking place attended by thousands of veterans and military personnel with a subsequent parade. On this, the police said one line of enquiry was whether the event was linked to nearby remembrance events.

Investigation 
It was established that the taxi driver picked up the passenger in Rutland Avenue, approximately 10 minutes drive from the hospital. Early reports suggested that on arrival he locked the doors of his vehicle on his passenger before it went up in flames, although a Counterterrorism spokesman noted that officers had not yet spoken to the driver as of Sunday evening.

Police subsequently confirmed that the fire had been caused by the ignition of a home-made explosive device. Merseyside Police armed units raided a property in the Sefton Park area, although the BBC reported that police had not confirmed whether the two incidents were related. Three men aged 29, 26, and 21 were arrested in Liverpool in the early morning of the next day, under the Terrorism Act. Police later said the arrests were a direct response to the attack. A fourth man, aged 20, was arrested the next day, 15 November. The arrest of the fourth man turned into a siege at the property he was in, and police negotiators were deployed. This arrest was supported by United Kingdom Special Forces. A number of houses in the Sefton Park area were evacuated. The Independent noted that this was a "usual precaution ... where explosive materials are suspected or found". A controlled explosion was carried out in the middle of Sefton Park, "a few hundred metres" from the house in Rutland Avenue where bomb-making equipment was discovered. The four arrested men were released on 15 November, the police saying "We are satisfied with the accounts they have provided and they have been released from police custody".

Perpetrator
The suspected perpetrator died during the incident. He was identified, a day after the explosion, as 32-year-old Emad al-Swealmeen, who was reported as having changed his name to Enzo Almeni; he was not known to MI5. A post-mortem found he died from injuries caused by the explosion and fire. He arrived in the UK in around 2014 and claimed for asylum as a Syrian refugee, which was denied as officials believed him to be Jordanian rather than Syrian; his immigration status at the time of the incident is unknown. Seven years before the incident he was sectioned after trying to kill himself and waving a knife in Liverpool city centre; following this he converted from Islam to Christianity in 2015. He had served time in a Middle East prison for serious assault. Police said that they believed he had lived at the Sutcliffe Street address for some time but had recently started renting a property in Rutland Avenue, where the bomb was made. Two days prior to the incident, al-Swealmeen called his brother, who lives in the United States, to say he might do "something bad".

Reports suggested that al-Swealmeen had converted to Christianity solely for asylum purposes, but the Church of England said that there was no evidence that converts' asylum claims are fast-tracked. He had been baptised in 2015 and confirmed in 2017, before losing contact with Liverpool Cathedral the following year; the Church of England said that it had processes in place "for discerning whether someone might be expressing a genuine commitment to faith". It was later revealed by investigators that al-Swealmeen had reverted back to Islam months before the attack. A coroner determined the improvised explosive device was made with "murderous intent" but it was unclear if the device was intended to detonate when it did.

Police found a Quran and prayer mat when searching al-Swealmeen's premises. Coroner Andre Rebello said: "It was fairly evident that he carried out the religious duties of someone who is a follower of Islam, not withstanding the reported conversion to Christianity."

Device

The explosive device was handmade by the suspect using components and chemicals purchased over several months, often using a false name. How the purchases were made is being investigated. Ball bearings were found to have been used inside the weapon, which would have increased its lethality had it detonated normally. Police said the partial detonation at the hospital may have been triggered prematurely from movement of the vehicle or during final assembly. They also stated the weapon was different from the bomb used in the 2017 Manchester Arena bombing.

Response
The driver was widely praised by members of the public and media following the incident, with some calling him a "hero" for stopping al-Swealmeen from getting inside the hospital by locking the doors of his taxi. Prime Minister Boris Johnson congratulated the driver, saying "it does look as though the taxi driver in question did behave with incredible presence of mind and bravery". On 15 November 2021, the police declared the explosion a terrorist incident, and the UK terror threat level was raised from substantial to severe. MI5 joined the investigation on the same day of the incident in a support role for the local police, while COBRA met on the morning of 15 November.

Home Secretary Priti Patel said that the bombing showed that Britain's asylum system is "dysfunctional" and that a "merry-go-round" of appeals by lawyers was keeping failed asylum seekers in the country.

At the official inquest at Liverpool and Wirral Coroner's Court on 30 December 2021, the senior coroner recorded a narrative conclusion, saying that al-Swealmeen had carried the improvised device into the taxi, after making it in his flat. He added: "It is found he manufactured the improvised explosive device, designed to project shrapnel, with murderous intent." The inquest also heard that Perry, the taxi driver, had been thrown forwards by the explosion and blacked out for a couple of seconds after the blast.

Notes

References

2021 in England
2020s in Liverpool
Crime in Liverpool
Events in Liverpool
Filmed improvised explosive device bombings
Improvised explosive device bombings in 2021
Improvised explosive device bombings in England
November 2021 crimes in Europe
November 2021 events in the United Kingdom
Terrorist incidents in the United Kingdom in 2021